Low on Ice (The Iceland Sessions) (commonly known as just Low on Ice) is the second solo studio album by German electronic artist Alec Empire, the third of five of his to be released on the Mille Plateaux label. Issued in 1995, Empire recorded the album over three days in August that same year during a tour of Iceland with his band Atari Teenage Riot. Primarily written outdoors in tents and recorded onto analog tapes, the record is noted for its ambient overtone, something not commonly associated with Empire's music.

Plans were announced of a triple-CD reissue containing unreleased archive material, this deluxe reissue was released in December 2020 through Alec Empire's website as Low on Ice (The Trilogy). An NFT edition featuring the same track list and different cover art was released later through OpenSea. "22:24", "Low on Ice", "metall Dub" and  both untitled tracks would later be included on the compilation album The Geist of Alec Empire.

Track listing

References

External links
Low on Ice at Discogs
Low on Ice on Bandcamp
Alec Empire's official fansite

1995 albums
Alec Empire albums